Hans Pienitz (born January 27, 1988) is an American-born German professional ice hockey defenceman who currently plays for EHC Basel of the Swiss National League B (NLB).

References

External links

1988 births
Living people
Hamburg Freezers players
Ice hockey people from Florida
ZSC Lions players
American men's ice hockey defensemen
German ice hockey players